The Ministry for Food, Agriculture, Forestry and Fisheries was a cabinet-level division of the government of South Korea.  It is headquartered at the national government complex in Gwacheon, Gyeonggi Province. It was established with the founding of the First Republic of Korea in 1948. In 2013, it was succeeded by the Ministry of Agriculture, Food and Rural Affairs.

In 2007, the minister was Park Hong-soo (appointed January 2005), a farm community advocate and former Uri Party parliamentarian from Namhae. The vice minister was Park Hae-sang. Under the "participatory government" of the Roh Moo-hyun administration, the MAF has been charged with helping to create a "Society of Balance Development".

The MFAFF was responsible for areas including crop insurance, land reclamation, agricultural statistics and the development of agricultural technology including genetically modified crops and environmentally friendly agriculture. It is also responsible for direct payments to rice farmers and for aspects of preparedness for natural disasters.

See also

 Agriculture in South Korea
 Government of South Korea
 Korea Forest Service

References

External links
 Ministry for Food, Agriculture, Forestry and Fisheries (other years)
 Ministry for Food, Agriculture, Forestry and Fisheries (2003-2004)
 Ministry for Food, Agriculture, Forestry and Fisheries 

South Korea, Food, Agriculture, Forestry and Fisheries
2008 establishments in South Korea
2013 disestablishments in South Korea
South Korea
South Korea
South Korea
Agricultural organizations based in South Korea